Australian Story is a national weekly current affairs and documentary style television series which is broadcast on ABC Television. It is produced specifically by the ABC News and Current Affairs Department. The program first aired on 29 May 1996, and since then it has continued to profile various Australian people, typically ones with a diverse background or notable reputation.

Australian Story tends to explore themes such as 'heroic achievement', 'taking a stand' and 'human weakness'. The episodes are known to frame people or situations in a sympathetic light. This personal approach to story-telling has been well received by many, with the program winning many awards including multiple Walkley Awards for excellence in journalism and four consecutive Logie Awards (2003–2006). As of 2013, it attracted an average audience of more than one million viewers each week, making it one of the most popular programs on ABC Television.

Format 
Australian Story is a weekly half-hour program which airs on Mondays at 8pm (AEST). The program is categorised as a documentary style current affairs program. This hybrid categorisation is a result of the program's decision to present newsworthy stories without the presence of an onscreen reporter. Instead, the program aims to have subjects tell their own stories in their own words.

Each week the program presents a story relating to a notable figure or unknown Australian with an interesting story. These are referred to as profiles and they convey subjective experiences. Profiles account for both Australian celebrities and lesser known more ordinary Australians. The program has an intimate approach to storytelling. The subjects are filmed in relevant environments such as their respective home or workplace. Profiles also include footage of and confessionals made by relevant family and friends. Each profile on average, is filmed over a period of 10–12 days, and each episode has an eight-week turnaround.

Broadcast history 
In 1996 the ABC restructured its current affairs program The 7:30 Report, turning separate state editions into one centralised national program. As a result, The 7:30 Report had less scope for localised, human interest stories. ABC in Brisbane established Australian Story as a result of the restructuring, and they were given a remit for rural coverage. The program began screening on 29 May 1996.

Australian Story was initially supposed to be a series of small magazine-style stories. It quickly started focusing on one single story for each episode, this is the format it still uses today. Given it was shot predominantly outside of a studio and always without the presence of a reporter, Australian Story was originally considered to be a novelty current affairs program. Other unconventional elements included their camera work and pacing which were considered to be slow and cinematic. These characteristics of the show contribute to its classification as a documentary.

In 2016 Australian Story celebrated its 20th anniversary and broadcast a two-part special. The special acknowledged many notable stories covered since the program's inception, such as Hazel Hawke's Alzheimer's diagnosis, Australian actress Jacki Weaver's bought with alcoholism and Gail Shann's life in rural Queensland after losing her arms. The special revealed that over the span of 20 years Australian Story had covered over 800 stories.

Caroline Jones was previously the program's presenter and would introduce the subject at the beginning of an episode. Occasionally a high-profile person would fill this role, such one off presenters included the likes of Matt Damon, Elton John and Dawn Fraser. Jones announced she was leaving Australian Story at the end of 2016. As a result of her departure, it was decided that episodes would no longer be introduced by a presenter.

Episodes of Australian Story have always aired on a Monday night at 8:00pm (AEST) on ABC TV. They are now also posted weekly to YouTube. In addition to this, episodes are made available via the AustralIan Story webpage and ABC iview.

Ratings

Recognition and awards

Criticism 
Australian Story has received criticism due to the fact that it does not belong solely to one genre. The program is classified by the ABC as a News and Current Affairs Program as well as a documentary series. Australian Story’s status as a documentary program though has been contested by Australian documentary filmmakers. This is because the program is a serial production made for a television network and from a formal broadcasting location. The program's status as a News and Current Affairs Program has also been questioned by academics who claim Australian Story exhibits a soft journalistic approach. Such critiques suggest the program has become a platform for people with high-profile stories who want to manage their image and the publicity surrounding it.

"The Road to Kerobokan" 
Australian Story aired an episode on 13 January 2006 entitled 'The Road to Kerobokan'. It detailed the story of Scott Rush, a 20-year-old Australian male who was on trial in Bali, Indonesia for his part in a heroin smuggling attempt. The episode aired only hours after Rush received a life sentence. Producers Helen Grasswill and Ruth Dexter chose not to disclose Rush's previous criminal misdemeanours in the episode per legal advice. This was because such information could damage Rush's appeal process. The episode still acknowledged that Rush had previous misdemeanours but did not detail them. The following morning on 14 February, the day after the Australian Story episode aired, the Queensland Courier-Mail published a front-page story with the headline 'Mule had history of crime'. This article exposed in more detail Rush's prior drug offences. In response, an episode of ABC's program Media Watch exposed that a negative sentiment was shared among many Australian Story viewers because the program had chosen not to disclose such information. As reported by Media Watch, Paul Toohey of Australian Magazine The Bulletin said 'whatever that Australian Story was, it was not journalism'. Such backlash has contributed to the idea that Australian Story is too soft on its subjects.

"Something in the Water" 
In 2010, Australian Story aired a two-part profile entitled "Something in the Water", broadcast on 15 and 22 February. The profile was on Alison Bleaney, a doctor and member of local council in the Tasmanian town of St Helens. Bleaney raised concerns about links between forest industry practices and the supposed presence of toxins in Tasmanian waterways. The episodes aired during the Tasmanian State election campaign, and garnered political attention. Accusations arose after the episodes aired, that they had been deliberately broadcast during the 2010 Tasmanian State Election campaign, in order to influence the result. Deborah Fleming who was Australian Story’s executive producer at the time responded to such criticism by saying that the program had sought only to report concerns rather than facts. Although past public surveys have revealed that Australians rely on the ABC News and Current Affairs Department as a source of trustworthy political information. It is expected that when this department gives an issue in-depth attention, it will become legitimated and treated as a current affair rather than solely a human interest story. Because of this, "Something in the Water" came under scrutiny with critics arguing it should have been more scientifically credible.

Notable Profiles

"The Gilded Cage" 
In 2002, Australian Story aired a profile on the former Australian Governor-General and Anglican Archbishop of Brisbane Dr Peter Hollingworth. The episode was entitled "The Gilded Cage". This was a notable episode because Australian Story had the exclusive interview with Hollingworth after a major school sex abuse scandal he had inadvertently played a part in. Whilst Hollingworth was Archbishop there were two serial pedophiles active in three Brisbane Anglican schools and the way he handled the situation was widely deemed across Australia as inappropriate. In "The Gilded Cage" Hollingworth implied that a 14-year-old girl was the one to initiate the sexual relationship she had with a Priest. These comments were met with controversy from the Australian public and he eventually resigned from his position as Governor-General over the matter. The candid and confessional nature of the interview served Australian Story's reputation as being a provider of real and personal stories.

"Murder He Wrote" 
"Murder He Wrote" is a notable Australian Story profile as it was the program's first ever two-part profile, spanning over two episodes. Prior to this profile Australian Story had never dedicated more than one episode to a story. The episodes were broadcast respectively on 29 July 2002 and 5 August 2002. They detailed the story of John Button, a man from Western Australia who was wrongfully convicted of murder. Button had been convicted of killing his girlfriend Rosemary Anderson, but the case was reopened when he appealed the conviction and attributed her death to the very high-profile serial killer Eric Edgar Cooke. Producer of these episodes, Wendy Page, had researched the case for 6 years before pursuing the story. Herself and Ian Harley won the Walkley Award for 'Current Affairs, Feature, Documentary more than 10 minutes' with this profile. Australian Story interviewed members of the Button, Anderson and Cooke families throughout the appeal process. The profile concluded with Button's exoneration, his case was one of the longest-standing convictions to be overturned in Australia's legal history.

"Into the Forest" 

In 2004 on 1 November, Australian Story aired the first episode of a two-part profile entitled "Into the Forest". This two-part profile explores the crimes of infamous Australian serial killer Ivan Milat. In Part 1, Australian Story spoke to Milat's younger brothers Bill and Richard, older brother Boris and sister-in-law Caroline as well as Clive Small who was the NSW Police Superintendent whilst Milat's case was open. According to Screen Australia this episode was the number 1 top rated Australian documentary on television in 2004. Producers Ben Cheshire and John Stewart won the TV Week Logie Award for 'Most Outstanding Public Affairs Programme' for this profile.

"Beyond Reasonable Doubt" 
"Beyond Reasonable Doubt" was Australian Story’s first ever three-part profile with three episodes broadcast in 2006 on 17 July 24 and 31 July. The case generated heated public debate and was of great interest to The Australian public at the time. It followed three men, Fazzari, Pereiras and Martinez who had been convicted for the murder of Phillip Walsham in 1998. The episodes focus heavily on Mirella Scaramella, the girlfriend of Fazzari and her efforts to fight the verdict. A year following this Australian Story profile, the three men were exonerated by the Western Australia Court of Appeal.

"Unbreakable" 

The Australian Story special entitled "Unbreakable" detailed the experience of competitor Garry Robinson who managed to survive a Black Hawk helicopter crash in Afghanistan in 2010 and went on to compete in the Invictus Games. The episode is notable because it attracted a complete audience of 2 million people. Most episodes generally garner an audience of 1 million people. "Unbreakable" aired on Monday 15 October 2018. Australian Story spoke exclusively to Prince Harry throughout this episode, as he is the founder of the Invictus Games. He was interviewed from inside Kensington Palace.

"A Complicated Life: Kerry Packer" 
In April 2014, Australian Story broadcast a two-part profile on Australian media mogul Kerry Packer. The profile detailed the life of Kerry Packer who had died in 2005 after a long and highly influential career. Part two of this profile garnered the highest average audience for 2013–14, with 1.6 million viewers. The profile was of great interest to Australians as it included interviews with particularly powerful men such as John Howard, Malcolm Turnbull and Richard Walsh. The profile also included an interview with Jodhi Meares, Packer's former daughter-in-law, who had never before spoken out about her experience being a part of the Packer family.

"Making his Mark" 
In March 2020, Australian Story profiled Marlion Pickett, the Perth native who turned his life around after serving 30 months in jail for burglary and aggravated burglary after turning to Australian rules football, including time in the WAFL with South Fremantle. After six and a half years with the Bulldogs, he got a chance to prove himself with an AFL club when Richmond selected him in the 2019 mid-season rookie draft. In that year's AFL Grand Final, Pickett then famously became just the sixth player ever to make his senior debut in a VFL or AFL Grand Final and the first since Collingwood's Keith Batchelor in 1952. He also became the first to both do so and become a premiership player since Melbourne's Francis Vine in 1926, recording 22 disposals, his first AFL goal and four Norm Smith Medal votes in Richmond's runaway victory at the Melbourne Cricket Ground over the GWS Giants by 17.12 (114) to 3.7 (25). The profile included interviews with Pickett, his partner Jessica Nannup, Richmond coach Damien Hardwick, Richmond multiple Norm Smith Medalist Dustin Martin, Richmond vice captain Jack Riewoldt and Clint Wheeldon, one of ABC's commentators for the Grand Final.

"Luc Longley: One Giant Leap" 
In 2021, Australian Story presented a 2-part profile on Luc Longley, the Melbourne native who became the first Australian to play in the NBA and played in the league for 10 seasons, including being the Chicago Bulls' center for their second three-peat from 1996 to 1998. ABC pointed out that Longley had not been featured in The Last Dance, the ESPN Films/Netflix miniseries about the 1997-98 Bulls and particularly their captain, 6-time NBA champion, 2-time Olympic gold medalist and Naismith Memorial Basketball Hall of Fame member Michael Jordan. The profile included interviews with Longley, Jordan, fellow Dream Team member Scottie Pippen – the only other Bull besides Jordan to play on all 6 of their championship teams between 1991 and 1998 – Bulls coach Phil Jackson, reserve guard and Golden State Warriors coach Steve Kerr and NBA journalist Sam Smith, the author of The Jordan Rules.

See also 
 List of Australian television series
 List of Australian Broadcasting Corporation programs

References

External links 
 
 

 Ric Richardson on Australian Story

Australian Broadcasting Corporation original programming
ABC News and Current Affairs
1996 Australian television series debuts
1990s Australian documentary television series
2000s Australian documentary television series
2010s Australian documentary television series
Television controversies in Australia